Emilia Tsoulfa (born 15 May 1973 in Athens) is a Greek sailor.

She has been sailing in Piraeus Sailing Club since she was 12 years old. She participated in over 470 main classes events and won Gold medals in: 2000, 2001, 2002 World and European championships. Also won the bronze medal in 1998 for European championships.

At the Olympic Games of 2004 in Athens, Emilia won the gold medal in the sailing competition / Women's double-handed dinghy event in the 470class with her pair Sofia Bekatorou. She has also participated at the 2000 Olympic Games in Sydney and also at 1996 Olympic sailing competition in Atlanta (finished 17th), being at that time the first female Greek sailor at the Olympic games.

In the Athens Olympic closing ceremony in 2004, Emilia Tsoulfa with Sofia Bekatorou participated in the extinguishing of the flame.

After her daughter's birth in 2006 she decided to stop for a while from sailing. Emilia now has three daughters and she is serving in the Greek Army as captain.

She competed with Ariadne Spanaki in the women's 470 event at the 2020 Summer Olympics.

References

External links
 
 
 
 Athens 2004 | Bekatorou / Tsoulfa Medal Ceremony on YouTube

ISAF World Sailor of the Year (female)
Living people
1973 births
Greek female sailors (sport)
Sailors (sport) from Athens
Olympic gold medalists for Greece
Olympic sailors of Greece
Sailors at the 1996 Summer Olympics – 470
Sailors at the 2000 Summer Olympics – 470
Sailors at the 2004 Summer Olympics – 470
Olympic medalists in sailing
Medalists at the 2004 Summer Olympics
470 class world champions
World champions in sailing for Greece
Sailors at the 2020 Summer Olympics – 470